Donald Thomas Croft (born January 1, 1949) is an American former professional football defensive tackle who played four season in the National Football League (NFL) for the Buffalo Bills and Detroit Lions. Croft played in a total of 34 career games between 1972 and 1976.

References

Living people
1949 births
Buffalo Bills players
Detroit Lions players
Players of American football from Texas
American football defensive tackles
UTEP Miners football players